Cindy la Regia is a Mexican film directed by Catalina Aguilar Mastretta, and Santiago Limón. The film is based on a character created by Ricardo Cucamonga, it stars Cassandra Sánchez Navarro as the leading character. It premiered on 24 January 2020 and grossed $106 million pesos in its theatrical run in Mexico, placing it among the country's highest-grossing produced films of all time.

Plot 
When Cindy (Cassandra Sánchez Navarro), the richest girl in San Pedro, Nuevo Leon, tells her boyfriend "El Gran Partidazo" that she doesn't want to marry him, she runs away to Mexico City, where she finds new friendships and unexpected paths. And that's where she learns that her possibilities in life are much more than she imagines.

Cast 
 Cassandra Sánchez Navarro as Cindy La Regia
 Regina Blandón as Angie
 Diana Bovio as Estrella
 Roberto Quijano as Gus
 Marianna Burelli as Laura
 Giuseppe Gamba as Mateo
 Mayra Batalla as Mary
 Nicolasa Ortíz Monasterio as Rox
 Diego Amozurrutia as Eduardo
 Isela Vega as Mercedes

References

External links 
 

Mexican comedy films
2020 films
2020s Mexican films